Albert Montañés won the final 3–6, 6–2, 6–3 against Daniel Muñoz de la Nava to capture the title.

Seeds

Draw

Finals

Top half

Bottom half

References
 Main Draw
 Qualifying Draw

Singles